The Syro-Malabar Catholic Eparchy of Satna  is an Eastern Catholic eparchy in India, under the Syro-Malabar Catholic Church based in the town of Satna. It was erected on February 26, 1977. It is spread out in the northern part of the state Madhya Pradesh. It was made Suffragan ad Instar to the ecclesiastical Province of Bhopal in 1968.The Eparchy of Satna, which comprises eight civil districts of Madhya Pradesh, namely, Satna, Chhatarpur, Panna, Rewa, Sidhi, Singrauli, Niwari and Tikamgarh, with a population of 1,11,20,815 was bifurcated from the diocese of Jabalpur. It was erected exarchy and entrusted to the Congregation  of Vincentian Fathers by the Holy See on 29 July 1968 by the Papal Bull In More Est of Pope Paul VI. Msgr Abraham D Mattam of Vincentian Congregation was nominated its first Apostolic Exarch on 15 August 1968.

The Exarchy was raised to the rank of an Eparchy on 12 March 1977 by the Papal Bull Ecclesiarum Orientalium of Pope Paul Vi and Mar Abraham D Mattam was appointed the first Eparch of Satna. The Installation and erection of the Eparchy took place on 31 July 1977.

After his retirement Mar Mathew Vaniakizhakkel VC was appointed the second Eparch of Satna on 14 January 2000 and was consecrated and installed on 12 April 2000.  He completed 14 years shepherding the Eparchy as a zealous bishop and pastor. He renounced his office as the bishop of Satna on 27 August 2014.

On 2 September 2014, the college of Eparchial Consultors elected Very Rev Fr George Mangalapilly as the Administrator of the Eparchy.

On 22 July 2015 Fr Joseph Kodakallil was appointed the third bishop of Satna. He was consecrated and installed on 15 September 2015.

Mar Joseph Kodakallil is the present bishop of the eparchy.

External links
 Syro-Malabar Catholic Diocese of Satna Catholic-Hierarchy

Eastern Catholic dioceses in India
Syro-Malabar Catholic dioceses
Christian organizations established in 1977
Roman Catholic dioceses and prelatures established in the 20th century
Christianity in Madhya Pradesh
1977 establishments in Madhya Pradesh